The 2001–02 Powergen Cup was the 31st edition of England's rugby union club competition. London Irish won the competition defeating Northampton Saints in the final. The event was sponsored by Powergen and the final was held at Twickenham Stadium.

Draw and results

First round (Sep 15)

Second round (Sep 29)

Third round (Oct 13)

Fourth round (Nov 3)

Fifth round (Nov 26)

Sixth round (Dec 15 & 16)

Quarter-finals (Jan 19)

Semi-finals (Mar 9)

Final

References

2001–02 rugby union tournaments for clubs
2001–02 in English rugby union
2001-02